Mia Dimšić (born 7 November 1992), also known professionally as Mia, is a Croatian singer and songwriter. She represented Croatia in the Eurovision Song Contest 2022 with the song "Guilty Pleasure" which didn't qualify into the Grand Final.

Early life and education 
Dimšić was born on November 7, 1992 in Osijek. She holds a MA degree in translation studies from the Faculty of Arts of the University of Osijek.

Career 
Dimšić started her career in 2014, when tamburica band Džentlmeni invited her to accompany them during their USA and Canada tour for the Croatian diaspora. "Budi mi blizu" was released on 12 October 2015 as Dimšić's first single. "Život nije siv" was released on 7 July 2016 as her debut's album lead single. Dimšić's debut album Život nije siv was released on 20 March 2017. Život nije siv peaked at number one on the Croatian Albums Chart. The album was eventually certified platinum in the country. Dimšić's second studio album and first Christmas record, Božićno jutro was released on 29 November 2017.

On 26 July 2019, Dimšić released "Sva blaga ovog svijeta" with Croatian singer Marko Tolja, along with the music video. The song debuted at number twelve on the Croatian HR Top 40 chart and marks Dimšić's and Tolja's first collaboration. In August, "Sva blaga ovog svijeta" climbed to the number one position, making it Dimšić's sixth single to top the HR Top 40 chart as lead artist.

On 17 December 2021, Dimšić was announced as one of the fourteen participants in Dora 2022, the national contest in Croatia to select the country's Eurovision Song Contest 2022 entry, with the song "Guilty Pleasure". On 19 February 2022, she won Dora 2022, thus gaining the right to represent Croatia in the Eurovision Song Contest 2022 in Turin, Italy.

Artistry

Influences 
Dimšić cites Taylor Swift, Kacey Musgraves, Norah Jones, Willie Nelson and Alison Krauss as her musical influences. Out of Croatian artists, Dimšić was influenced by Neno Belan, Zlatan Stipišić Gibonni, Tedi Spalato, Oliver Dragojević and Hari Rončević.

Musical style and songwriting 
Dimšić uses her life experiences as an inspiration in her work. Dimšić uses Gibson Hummingbird for most of her live performances.

Discography 

Život nije siv (2017)
Božićno jutro (2017)
Sretan put (2019)

Awards and nominations

References

External links 

Living people
1993 births
Croatian pop singers
People from Osijek
21st-century Croatian women singers
Croatian folk-pop singers
Croatian pop musicians
Croatian singer-songwriters
Croatian guitarists
Eurovision Song Contest entrants for Croatia
Eurovision Song Contest entrants of 2022
University of Osijek alumni